Dorchester County Courthouse and Jail is a historic courthouse building located at Cambridge, the county seat of Dorchester County, Maryland.  It is an Italianate influenced, painted brick structure, which was enlarged and extensively remodeled with Georgian Revival decorative detailing in the 1930s.  The building entrance is flanked on the north by a three-story tower. It was constructed in 1853, and is the only courthouse designed by Richard Upjohn in Maryland.

The County Jail, which stood to the southeast of the courthouse from about 1882 until its demolition in 1994, was a Queen Anne and Romanesque Revival style granite structure with brick and terra cotta features.   The jail was the work of the Baltimore architect, Charles L. Carson.

It was listed on the National Register of Historic Places in 1982.

References

External links
, including photo from 1981, at Maryland Historical Trust

Cambridge, Maryland
Courthouses on the National Register of Historic Places in Maryland
Queen Anne architecture in Maryland
Romanesque Revival architecture in Maryland
Buildings and structures in Dorchester County, Maryland
County courthouses in Maryland
Government buildings completed in 1853
County government buildings in Maryland
National Register of Historic Places in Dorchester County, Maryland
Courthouses in Maryland